Amorphoscelis is a genus of praying mantis in the family Amorphoscelidae; records of occurrence are from Africa and tropical Asia.

Species
The following species are recognised in the genus Amorphoscelis:

 Amorphoscelis abyssinica
 Amorphoscelis angolica
 Amorphoscelis annulicornis
 Amorphoscelis asymmetrica
 Amorphoscelis austrogermanica
 Amorphoscelis bimaculata
 Amorphoscelis borneana
 Amorphoscelis brunneipennis
 Amorphoscelis chinensis
 Amorphoscelis chopardi
 Amorphoscelis elegans
 Amorphoscelis griffini
 Amorphoscelis grisea
 Amorphoscelis hainana
 Amorphoscelis hamata
 Amorphoscelis huismani
 Amorphoscelis javana
 Amorphoscelis kenyensis
 Amorphoscelis lamottei
 Amorphoscelis laxeretis
 Amorphoscelis machadoi
 Amorphoscelis morini
 Amorphoscelis naumanni
 Amorphoscelis nigriventer
 Amorphoscelis nubeculosa
 Amorphoscelis opaca
 Amorphoscelis orientalis
 Amorphoscelis pallida
 Amorphoscelis pantherina
 Amorphoscelis papua
 Amorphoscelis parva
 Amorphoscelis pellucida
 Amorphoscelis phaesoma
 Amorphoscelis philippina
 Amorphoscelis pinheyi
 Amorphoscelis pulchella
 Amorphoscelis pulchra
 Amorphoscelis punctata
 Amorphoscelis reticulata
 Amorphoscelis rufula
 Amorphoscelis siebersi
 Amorphoscelis singaporana
 Amorphoscelis spinosa
 Amorphoscelis stellulatha
 Amorphoscelis subnigra
 Amorphoscelis sulawesiana
 Amorphoscelis sumatrana
 Amorphoscelis tigrina
 Amorphoscelis tuberculata
 Amorphoscelis villiersi

References

 
Amorphoscelidae
Mantodea genera
Mantodea of Africa
Mantodea of Asia